D-list could refer to

 D-list, a status on the Ulmer scale of fame and "bankability", meaning very minor celebrity 
 Kathy Griffin: My Life on the D-List, a reality television show
 Difference list, in computer science, a data structure for representing lists with efficient append operations

See also 
 Delisting (disambiguation)